Corica is a small genus of sprats that occur in rivers in South Asia and Southeast Asia.  Two described species are placed in the genus.

Species
 Corica laciniata Fowler, 1935 (Bangkok river sprat)
 Corica soborna F. Hamilton, 1822 (Ganges river sprat)

References
 

Clupeidae
Fish of Asia
Taxa named by Francis Buchanan-Hamilton
Freshwater fish genera